Orange Bay is a small bay in Hanover Parish, Jamaica to the north of the resort town of Negril.

References

External links 
Aerial view
Photo: 

Bays and coves of Jamaica
Geography of Hanover Parish